Archibald Frederick Giles (6 July 1895 – 5 April 1941) was an Australian rules footballer who played for the Essendon Football Club and North Melbourne Football Club in the Victorian Football League (VFL).

Notes

External links 
		

1895 births
1941 deaths
Australian rules footballers from Melbourne
Australian Rules footballers: place kick exponents
Essendon Football Club players
North Melbourne Football Club players
People from West Melbourne, Victoria